Aluta is a genus of small shrubs in the family Myrtaceae. Species occur in Western Australia, South Australia and the Northern Territory. When the genus was erected in 2000, three species were transferred from the genus Thryptomene.

Species include:
Aluta appressa (C.R.P.Andrews) Rye & Trudgen  
Aluta aspera (E.Pritz.) Rye & Trudgen   
Aluta maisonneuvei (F.Muell. Rye & Trudgen)    
Aluta quadrata Rye & Trudgen   
Aluta teres Rye & Trudgen

References

External links
A Key to Western Australian Species in the Chamelaucieae Tribe of Myrtaceae

Myrtales of Australia
Myrtaceae genera
Taxa named by Barbara Lynette Rye
Taxa named by Malcolm Eric Trudgen
Endemic flora of Australia